Quellhuacotarriti (Aymara qillwa, qiwña, qiwlla Andean gull, quta lake, Quechua rit'i snow, "gull lake snow (mountain)") is a mountain in the Carabaya mountain range in the Andes of Peru, about  high. It is located in the Puno Region, Carabaya Province, Macusani District. Quellhuacotarriti lies southwest of Allincapac and south of Vela Cunca.

References

Mountains of Peru
Mountains of Puno Region